The 2018 Golden Globes (Portugal) were held on 21 May 2018 and were broadcast by SIC. The show was presented by César Mourão.

Winners and nominees

Cinema 

Best Film:

 São Jorge - Marco Martins
 Peregrinação - João Botelho
 Fátima - João Canijo
 A Fábrica de Nada - Pedro Pinho

Best Actor:

 Nuno Lopes - São Jorge
 José Raposo - São Jorge
 Cláudio da Silva - Peregrinação
 Sinde Filipe - Zeus

Best Actress:

 Rita Blanco - Fátima
 Anabela Moreira - Fátima
 Lia Carvalho - Verão Danado
 Carla Galvão - A Fábrica de Nada

Theatre 

Best Play:

 Sopro - Tiago Rodrigues
 Bacantes: Prelúdio Para uma Purga - Marlene Freitas
 Splendid's - Carlos Avilez
 Todo o Mundo é um Palco - Marco Martins and Beatriz Batarda

Best Actor:

 Miguel Loureiro - Esquecer
 Elmano Sancho - Display
 Ivo Canelas - Pedro e o Capitão
 Pedro Gil - Pedro e o Capitão

Best Actress:

 Rita Cabaço - A Estupidez
 Isabel Abreu - Sopro
 Rita Lello - Mariana Pineda
 Ana Palma -  Display

Fashion 

Best Stylist: 

 Alexandra Mouro
 Filipe Faísca
 Dino Alves
 Carlos Gil
   
Best Male Model:

 Fernando Cabral - Karacter Agency 
 Luís Borges - Central Models
 Francisco Henriques - Central Models
 Ricardo Cotovio - Central Models

Best Female Model:

 Maria Miguel - L'Agence
 Sara Sampaio - Central Models
 Maria Clara - L'Agence
 Isilda - Central Models

Sports 
Best Male Coach:

 Leonardo Jardim - Football
 Rui Vitória - Football
 José Mourinho - Football
 Hélio Lucas - Canoeing

Best Male Athlete:

 Cristiano Ronaldo - Football
 Ricardinho - Futsal
 Fernando Pimenta - Canoeing
 Nélson Évora - Athletics

Best Female Athlete:

 Inês Henriques - Athletics
 Joana Schenker - Bodyboard
 Teresa Bonvalot - Surf
 Joana Ramos - Judo

Music 

Best Individual Performer:

 Raquel Tavares - Roberto Carlos por Raquel Tavares
 Salvador Sobral - Excuse Me (Ao Vivo)
 Richie Campbell - Lisboa
 Miguel Araújo - Giesta

Best Group:

 HMB - Mais
D.A.M.A - Lado a Lado
 The Gift - Altar
 Ermo - Lo-Fi Moda

Best Song:

 "Amar pelos dois" - Salvador Sobral
 "Manto de Água" - Agir ft. Ana Moura
 "Se me deixasses ser" - Tiago Bettencourt
 "Como É Grande o Meu Amor por Você" - Raquel Tavares

Best Newcomer 

 Bárbara Bandeira - Music
 Rúben Dias - Football
 João Maneira - Acting
 Calema - Music

Award of Merit and Excellence 

 José Cid

References 

2018 film awards
2018 music awards
2018 television awards
Golden Globes (Portugal)
2018 in Portugal
May 2018 events in Portugal